The Originators is the fifth studio album by American hip hop duo The Beatnuts. It was released on July 23, 2002, via Landspeed Records. Recording sessions took place at Soho Studios and The Big Fat Suite in New York. Production was handled entirely by the Beatnuts, except for one song, "Originate", which was produced by member JuJu and Large Professor. It features guest appearances from Problemz, Amaretta, Chris Chandler, Cormega, El Gant, Ill Bill, Large Professor, Marley Metal, Tony Touch, Triple Seis and former member Al' Tariq.

Likely because of its indie record label, it failed to reach the Billboard 200 like the Beatnuts' prior four full-length albums, but managed to appear on the Independent Albums chart. Its beats and party vibe were well received, but its lyrics were criticized for lacking substance in the same vein as prior releases. Four singles were released in promotion of The Originators, but none of them charted.

Track listing

Personnel
Lester "Psycho Les" Fernandez – vocals, producer (tracks: 2, 3, 5, 6, 8-14), mixing (tracks: 2, 3, 5-14), executive producer
Jerry "JuJu" Tineo – vocals, producer & mixing (tracks: 2, 3, 5-14), executive producer
Berntony "Al' Tariq" Smalls – vocals (track 12)
Corey "Problemz" Bullock – vocals (tracks: 3, 8)
William "Ill Bill" Braunstein – vocals (track 3)
Chris Chandler – vocals (track 5), additional vocals (tracks: 6, 10)
Joseph "Tony Touch" Hernandez – vocals (track 6)
Big Ang – additional vocals (track 6)
William Paul "Large Professor" Mitchell – vocals & producer (track 7)
E. "Armaretta" Hernandez – vocals (track 8)
Cory "Cormega" McKay – vocals (track 9)
Joshua Adam "El Gant" Gent – vocals (track 12)
Sammy "Triple Seis" Garcia – vocals (track 13)
Marley Fernandez – vocals (track 13)
Chris Conway – recording (tracks: 2, 3, 5, 7, 11, 13, 14), mixing (tracks: 2, 3, 5, 7-11, 13, 14)
Ryan West – recording (tracks: 2, 5, 6, 8-12), mixing (tracks: 6, 12)
Henley Halem – co-executive producer
Trevor "Karma" Gendron – design

Charts

References

External links

2002 albums
The Beatnuts albums
Albums produced by the Beatnuts
Albums produced by Large Professor